Kaylah McPhee (born 4 February 1998) is an Australian tennis player.

She has career-high WTA rankings of 199 in singles, achieved on 16 September 2019, and 228 in doubles, reached on 10 February 2020. She has won three doubles titles on the ITF Women's Circuit.

McPhee won her biggest ITF title at the 2019 Bendigo Women's International in the doubles event, partnering Maddison Inglis.

Grand Slam performance timelines

Singles

Doubles

ITF Circuit finals

Singles: 2 (2 runner-ups)

Doubles: 5 (3 titles, 2 runner-ups)

Notes

References

External links
 
 
 

1998 births
Living people
Australian female tennis players
Tennis players from Brisbane